Tindi is a Northeast Caucasian language spoken in the Russian republic of Dagestan. Tindis call their language Idarab mitstsi meaning 'the language of the Idar village'. It is only an oral language; Avar or Russian are used in written communication instead. Tindi vocabulary contains many loanwords from Avar, Turkish, Arabic, and Russian. It has approximately 2,150 speakers.

References

External links

The peoples of the Red Book: Tindis

Northeast Caucasian languages
Andic languages
Dagestan
Languages of Russia
Endangered Caucasian languages